Shuangpengxi Township (Mandarin: 双朋西乡) is a township in Tongren County, Huangnan Tibetan Autonomous Prefecture, Qinghai, China. In 2010, Shuangpengxi Township had a total population of 3,276: 1,582 males and 1,694 females: 774 aged under 14, 2,155 aged between 15 and 65 and 347 aged over 65.

References 

Township-level divisions of Qinghai
Huangnan Tibetan Autonomous Prefecture